Carlos Cuadrado (born 1 June 1983) is a former Spanish professional tennis player. He won the French Open juniors singles in 2001.

Career
His best performance at a professional tournament was at Viña del Mar in 2006, when he progressed to the quarterfinals. After progressing through qualifying, he defeated Tomas Behrend and Daniel Gimeno-Traver before losing against Chilean Nicolás Massú 6–4, 6–7, 3–6. After defeating Dmitry Tursunov in the ATP 500 Barcelona he fell to Paul-Henri Mathieu. In a Challenger tournament in Tarragona, he retired against Albert Portas due to a hip injury. His career ended in the same year as he retired at the age of 22.

Coaching
After his retirement, Cuadrado coached Svetlana Kuznetsova.

ATP Challenger and ITF Futures finals

Singles: 4 (1–3)

Doubles: 1 (0–1)

Junior Grand Slam finals

Singles: 1 (1 title)

References

External links

French Open junior champions
Spanish expatriate sportspeople in Australia
Spanish male tennis players
Tennis players from Barcelona
Tennis players from Sydney
Living people
1983 births
Grand Slam (tennis) champions in boys' singles